Typeeto is a software that allows users to use a Bluetooth-compatible Macintosh keyboard with a range of different devices, including iOS and Android smartphones and tablets, Apple TV, game consoles, Windows PCs, iPad, iPhone, iPod Touch, and MacBooks. The tool allows the keyboard to connect to multiple devices simultaneously and users can easily switch between them using either a mouse click or a designated hotkey.

Overview
Typeeto received recognition for its versatility and functionality when it was featured on Product Hunt and received over 200 upvotes from users. This positive response from the community highlights the usefulness of Typeeto as a tool for seamless keyboard integration between different devices.

References

Android (operating system) software
Bluetooth software
iOS software
iPod software
PlayStation 4 software
Utilities for macOS
Utilities for Windows
Xbox (console) software